Somellera is a station on the Buenos Aires Premetro. It was opened on 29 April 1987 together with the other Premetro stations. The station is located in the Barrio of Villa Soldati and is located near the Premetro workshops, where the Materfer trams are serviced and stored.

References

External links

Buenos Aires PreMetro stations
Buenos Aires Underground stations